Ƿilƿeorþunga is the Old English practice of fountain or well worship. This belief was banned in the 16th Canon Law enacted under King Edgar of England (939–946) in the tenth century.

See also
Clootie well
Well dressing

External links
 An English Heathenism glossary
 A description of the practice

Old English
Anglo-Saxon paganism
Water wells in England